Bhilad railway station is a small railway station in Valsad district, Gujarat, India. Its code is BLD. It serves Bhilad town. The station consists of three platforms. The platform is partly sheltered. It lacks sanitation facilities but water and snacks are available.
Disembark here for Sarigam GIDC and Silvassa town. Passenger, MEMU, Express and Superfast trains halt here.

Major trains

 22929/30 Bhilad–Vadodara Superfast Express
 19215/16 Saurashtra Express
 22953/54 Gujarat Superfast Express
 19023/24 Firozpur Janata Express

References 

Railway stations in Valsad district
Mumbai WR railway division